Valentine of Passau (died 7 January 475) was a bishop, abbot, monk, and hermit. He was a papal missionary bishop to Rhaetia (present Switzerland, Bavaria, Tyrol, and South Tyrol); and among the first patrons of Passau. He finally lived as a hermit in Zenoburg, Merano, South Tyrol, northern Italy.

References

Raetia
475 deaths
Roman Catholic bishops of Passau
5th-century bishops in the Roman Empire